Robidoux Pass, also known as Roubadeau Pass, Roubedeau Pass, Roubideau Pass, Roubidoux Pass and Roubadeau Pass Gap, is a gap passing through the Wildcat Hills near Scottsbluff, Nebraska about  west of Gering, Nebraska. The gap was on the Great Platte River Road section of the historic Oregon or Emigrant Trail. Used by thousands of emigrants to the west from 1843-1851, the pass is a National Historic Landmark.

The area was named for members of the Robideau family, either Antoine or Joseph E. Robideau (also spelled Robidoux), who in the 1840s maintained a trading post east of the gap and later one at Scottsbluff.  It contained blacksmith and grog shops, as well as other goods. The pass lies a few miles west southwest of Scottsbluff, Nebraska in broken country south of the North Platte River and the Wildcat Hills.

Scotts Bluff blocked wagon travel along the south bank of the North Platte River, forcing early travelers to swing south and go through Robidoux Pass, a natural gateway in the great bluffs. In 1850, a shorter route was opened through Mitchell Pass, just south of the monument itself and much closer to the Platte River and eliminated the eight-mile swing south.

A local road, Robidoux Road, now passes through the gap.

The site was declared a National Historic Landmark in 1961.

See also
List of National Historic Landmarks in Nebraska

References

External links
Quickview map USGS

Road transportation infrastructure on the National Register of Historic Places
National Historic Landmarks in Nebraska
Landforms of Scotts Bluff County, Nebraska
Landforms of Nebraska
Natural features on the National Register of Historic Places in Nebraska
Mountain passes of Nebraska
National Register of Historic Places in Scotts Bluff County, Nebraska